S302 may refer to :
 HNoMS Utstein (S302), a Royal Norwegian Navy Ula class submarine
 Sony Ericsson S302, a 2008 mobile phone model
 a Victorian Railways S class (diesel) locomotive